The Busan International Film Festival (BIFF, previously Pusan International Film Festival, PIFF), held annually in Haeundae-gu, Busan (also Pusan), South Korea, is one of the most significant film festivals in Asia. The first festival, held from 13 to 21 September 1996, was also the first international film festival in Korea. The main focus of the BIFF is to introduce new films and first-time directors, especially those from Asian countries. Another notable feature is the appeal of the festival to young people, both in terms of the large youthful audience it attracts and through its efforts to develop and promote young talent. In 1999, the Pusan Promotion Plan (renamed Asian Project Market in 2011) was established to connect new directors to funding sources. The 16th BIFF in 2011 saw the festival move to a new permanent home, the Busan Cinema Center in Centum City.

History 
 1st Busan International Film Festival, 13–21 September 1996
 Films screened: 173 films from 31 countries
 Opening Film: Secrets & Lies, Mike Leigh, UK/France
 Closing Film: In Expectation, Ming Zhang, China
 Participating guests: 224 guests from 27 countries
 Total audience: 184,071
 2nd Busan International Film Festival, 10–18 October 1997
 Films screened: 163 films from 33 countries
 Opening Film: Chinese Box, Wayne Wang, UK/France/USA/Japan
 Closing Film: Eighteen Springs, Ann Hui, Hong Kong-China
 Participating guests: 450 guests from 30 countries
 Total audience: 170,206
 3rd Busan International Film Festival, 24 September – 1 October 1998
 Films screened: 211 films from 41 countries
 Opening Film: The Silence, Mohsen Makhmalbaf, Iran/France
 Closing Film: Kanzo sensei, Shohei Imamura, Japan
 Participating guests: 659 guests from 25 countries
 Total audience: 192,547 (paid audiences: 174,870)
 4th Busan International Film Festival, 14–23 October 1999
 Films screened: 207 films from 53 countries
 Opening Film: Peppermint Candy, Lee Chang-Dong, Korea
 Closing Film: Not One Less, Zhang Yimou, China
 Participating guests: 555 guests from 36 countries
 Total audience: 180,914
 5th Busan International Film Festival, 6–14 October 2000
 Films screened: 207 films from 55 countries
 Opening Film: The Wrestlers, Buddhadeb Dasgupta, India
 Closing Film: In the Mood for Love, Wong Kar-wai, Hong Kong-China
 Participating guests: 3017 guests from 39 countries
 Total audience: 181,708 people
 6th Busan International Film Festival, 9–17 November 2001
 Films screened: 201 films from 60 countries
 Opening Film: The Last Witness, Bae Chang-ho, Korea
 Closing Film: The Legend of Suriyothai, Chatrichalerm Yukol, Thailand
 Participating guests: 3,761 guests from 30 countries
 Total audience: 143,103 people
 7th Busan International Film Festival, 14–23 November 2002
 Films screened: 226 films from 57 countries
 Opening Film: The Coast Guard, Kim Ki-duk, Korea
 Closing Film: Dolls, Kitano Takeshi, Japan
 Participating guests: 4,387 guests from 35 countries
 Total audience: 167,349 people
 8th Busan International Film Festival, 2–10 October 2003
 Films screened: 243 works from 61 countries
 Opening Film: Doppelganger, Kiyoshi Kurosawa, Japan
 Closing Film: Acacia, Park Ki-hyung, Korea
 Participating guests: 2,523 people from 44 countries
 Invited guests: 4,387 people from 50 countries (Inc. PPP& Press)
 Total audience: 165,102(paid audiences: 145,041)
 9th Busan International Film Festival, 7–15 October 2004
 Films screened: Total 262 films from 63 countries
 Opening Film: 2046, Wong Kar-wai, Hong Kong-China
 Closing Film: The Scarlet Letter, Daniel H. Byun, Korea
 Participating guests: Total 5,638 guests from 50 countries
 Total audience: 166,164
 10th Busan International Film Festival, 6–14 October 2005
 Films screened: 307 films from 73 countries
 Opening Film: Three Times, Hou Hsiao-hsien, Taiwan
 Closing Film: Wedding Campaign, Hwang Byung-kook, Korea
 Participating guests: 6,088 from 55 countries
 Total audience: 192,970
 11th Busan International Film Festival, 12–20 October 2006
 Films screened: 245 films from 63 countries
 Opening Film: Traces of Love, Kim Dae-seung, Korea
 Closing Film: Crazy Stone, Ning Hao, China/Hong Kong-China
 Participating guests: 8,321 from 51 countries (inc. ASIAN FILM MARKET & press)
 Total audience: 162,835
 12th Busan International Film Festival, 4–12 October 2007
 Films Screened: 271 films from 64 countries in 770 screenings
 Opening Film: Assembly, Feng Xiaogang, China
 Closing Film: Evangelion 1.0: You Are (Not) Alone, Kazuya Tsurumaki, Hideaki Anno, Masayuki, Japan
 Participating guests: 7,361(exc. ASIAN FILM MARKET)
 Total audience: 198,603
 13th Busan International Film Festival, 2–10 October 2008
 Films screened: 315 films from 60 countries. 827 screenings.
 Opening Film: The Gift to Stalin, Rustem Abdrashev, Russia/Kazakhstan/Israel/Poland
 Closing Film: I Am Happy, Yoon Jong-chan, Korea
 Participating guests: 11,110 in total (inc. ASIAN FILM MARKET)
 Total audience: 198,818
 14th Busan International Film Festival, 8–16 October 2009
 Films Screened: 355 films from 70 countries. 803 screenings.
 World Premiere: 98 Films (72 Feature Films, 26 Short Films)
 International Premiere: 46 Films (41 Feature Films, 5 Short Films)
 Opening Film: Good Morning President, Jang Jin, Korea
 Closing Film: The Message, Gao Qunshu, Chen Kuo-fu, China
 Invited Guests (exc. Asian Film Market): 8,602 in total (Guests: 6,400, Press: 2,202)
 Total audience: 173,516
 15th Busan International Film Festival, 7–15 October 2010
 Films Screened: 306 films from 67 countries（101 World Premieres / 52 International Premieres）
 Screening Venue: Total of 232,851 seats and 36 screens at 6 theaters
 Opening Film: Under the Hawthorn Tree, Zhang Yimou, China
 Closing Film: Camellia, Wisit Sasanatieng, Isao Yukisada, Jang Joon-hwan, Thailand/Japan/Korea
 Participating guests: 9,367
 3,784 from Korea
 906 from out of Korea
 1,651 Cinephiles
 789 Market participants
 2,237 Press Accreditations
 Total audience: 182,046
 16th Busan International Film Festival, 6–14 October 2011
 Films Screened: 307 films from 70 countries（86 World Premieres / 45 International Premieres）
 Screening Venue: Total of 235,907 seats and 36 screens at 5 theaters
 Opening Film: Always, Song Il-gon, South Korea
 Closing Film: Chronicle of My Mother, Masato Harada, Japan
 Participating guests: 11,268
 Domestic: 4,482
 International: 765
 Cinephile: 1,999
 Market: 1,080
 Busan Cinema Forum: 502
 Accredited Press: 2,440 
 * Market and Forum participants include only the numbers accredited with the Badge
 Total audience:  196,177
 17th Busan International Film Festival, 4–13 October 2012
 Films Screened: 304 films from 75 countries（96 World Premieres / 39 International Premieres）
 Screening Venue: 37 screens at 7 theaters
 Opening Film: Cold War, Longman Leung, Sunny Luk, Hong Kong
 Closing Film: Television, Mostofa Sarwar Farooki, Bangladesh
 Participating guests: 11,519
 Domestic: 4,830
 International: 806
 Cinephile: 2,149
 Market: 1,098 
 Busan Cinema Forum: 279
 Accredited Press: 2,357
 Total audience:  221,002
 18th Busan International Film Festival, 3–12 October 2013
 Films Screened: 299 films from 70 countries（94 World Premieres / 40 International Premieres）
 Screening Venue: 35 screens at 7 theaters (Market and unofficial screenings excluded)
 Opening Film: Vara: A Blessing, Khyentse Norbu, Bhutan
 Closing Film: The Dinner, Kim Dong-hyun, Korea
 Participating guests: 9,991
 Domestic: 3,423
 Foreign: 751
 Cinephile: 1,667
 Market: 1,272
 BC&F: 616
 Accredited Press: 2,262（Domestic: 1,963, Foreign:299）
 Total audience: 217,865
19th Busan International Film Festival, 2–11 October 2014
 Films Screened: 312 from 79 countries（96 World Premieres / 36 International Premieres）
 Screening Venue: 33 screens at 7 theaters (Market and unofficial screenings excluded)
 Opening Film: Paradise in Service, Doze Niu, Taiwan
 Closing Film: Gangster Payday, Lee Po-cheung, Hong Kong
 Participating guests: 10,173
 Domestic: 3,362
 Foreign: 775
 Cinephile: 1,429
 Market: 1,566
 BC&F: 750
 Accredited Press: 2,291
 Total audience: 226,473
20th Busan International Film Festival, 1–10 October 2015
 Films Screened: 302 from 75 countries（94 World Premieres / 31 International Premieres）
 Screening Venue: 35 screens at 6 theaters (Market and unofficial screenings excluded)
 Opening Film: Zubaan, Mozez Singh, India
 Closing Film: Mountain Cry, Larry Yang, China/United States
 Participating guests: 9,685
 Domestic: 3,226
 Foreign: 775
 Cinephile: 1,405
 Market: 1,571
 BC&F: 403
 Accredited Press: 2,325
 Total audience: 227,377
21st Busan International Film Festival, 6–15 October 2016
 Films Screened: 299 from 69 countries 
 Opening Film: A Quiet Dream - Zhang Lu, Korea
 Closing Film: The Dark Wind, Hussein Hassan, Iraq/Germany/Qatar
 Participating guests: 5,759, excluding the press
 Total audience: 165,149
22nd Busan International Film Festival, 12–21 October 2017
 Films Screened: 300 from 76 countries 
 Opening Film: Glass Garden - Shin Su-won, South Korea
 Closing Film: Love Education, Sylvia Chang, China/Taiwan
 Total audience: 192,991
23rd Busan International Film Festival, 4–13 October 2018
 Films Screened: 324 from 79 countries 
 Opening Film: Beautiful Days - 	Jéro Yun, South Korea
 Closing Film: Master Z: The Ip Man Legacy, Yuen Woo-ping, Hong Kong/China
 Total audience: 191,000
24th Busan International Film Festival, 3–12 October 2019
 Films Screened: 299 from 85 countries
 Opening Film: The Horse Thieves. Roads of Time - Yerlan Nurmukhambetov, Lisa Takeba, Kazakhstan/Japan
 Closing Film: Moonlit Winter - Lim Dae-hyung, South Korea
 Total audience: 189,116
25th Busan International Film Festival, 21–30 October 2020
 Films Screened: 192 films from 68 countries
 Opening Film: Septet: The Story of Hong Kong - Johnnie To, Ringo Lam, Hark Tsui, Sammo Hung, Ann Hui, Patrick Tam Yuen, Wo Ping, Hong Kong, China/China
 Closing Film: Josee, the Tiger and the Fish - Tamura Kotaro, Japan
 Total audience: 20,135
26th Busan International Film Festival, 6 to 15 October 2021
 Films Screened: 223 films from 70 countries 
 Opening Film: Heaven: To the Land of Happiness by Im Sang-soo
 Closing Film: Anita by	Longman Leung
 Total audience:76,072
27th Busan International Film Festival, 5 to 14 October 2022.
 Films Screened: 242 films from 71 countries
 Opening Film: Scent of Wind - Hadi Mohaghegh, Iran
 Closing Film: A Man - Ishikawa Kei, Japan

Official program sections 

The Busan International Film Festival is organised in various sections:

Gala Presentation: Gala Presentation screens new master cineastes, films, and premieres.
A Window on Asian Cinema: A showcase of new and/or representative films by Asian filmmakers.
New Currents: The only international competition section featuring the first or the second feature films by future directors of Asian cinema.
Korean Cinema Today: Selected Korean feature films are shown in two sub-sections, Panorama and Vision. These two sub-sections recognise the current production trend of Korean cinema and anticipate its future.
Korean Cinema Retrospective: Revisiting the history of Korean cinema by spotlighting films of a certain notable director or films with a significant theme.
World Cinema: Presentation of new works by filmmakers along with films that help understanding the recent trends in world cinema.
Wide Angle: A section showing short films, animation, documentaries, and experimental films.
Open Cinema: outdoor screening venue where a collection of new films, combining both art and mass popularity, are shown.
Flash Forward: This section is a collection of first or second films of up-and-coming filmmakers from non-Asian countries.
Midnight Passion: films of diverse genres.
Special Programs in Focus: A retrospective and special showcase of films of a certain notable director or genre.

Official divisions 

Asian Film Market: Launched in 2006 as a marketplace for the industry events at the Busan International Film Festival.
Asian Project Market (former PPP: Pusan Promotion Plan) is a pre-market.
 Asian Cinema Fund: The Asian Cinema Fund is a funding program to help activate more independent film productions and to set up a stable production environment. It supports projects in various stages and categories. The 900 million won (approximately US$900,000) Asian Cinema Fund will be used to provide support to seven projects in script development, five post-productions, and thirteen documentary films.
 The Script Development Fund is aimed at helping screenwriters complete their scripts.
 The Post-Production Fund is made possible through the support of Korean post-production companies and the Korean Film Council. With this fund, the director is invited to Korea to work on sound and DI with Korean post-production houses. It will help the director complete his or her film in 35mm. 
 The Asian Network of Documentary Fund was initiated in 2002 and sponsored by six universities and corporations in the Busan region. As a part of the Busan International Film Festival, and holds master classes and clinics to stabilise the environment for documentary productions.
 Asian Film Academy (AFA) is an educational program where prospective filmmakers and established directors from Asia gather to deliberate and prepare for the future of Asian cinema. 

 Busan Cinema Forum (BCF) is an academic event for filmmakers and scholars, launched on 10 October 2011. It aims to enhance the knowledge and support of the film industry and film aesthetics.

Awards 
A number of awards are handed out each year, including:

Asian Filmmaker of the Year

Korean Cinema Award 
The Korean Cinema Award(한국영화공로상) is presented to cineastes that have made a notable contribution in the globalization of Korean cinema.

The Choon-yun Award

New Currents Award

Kim Jiseok Award

BIFF Mecenat Award 
BIFF Mecenat Award(비프메세나상) is granted to the best documentary from Korea and Asia in Wide Angle competitive section. The winner will be granted KRW 10,000,000(approx. USD 8,500) with the purpose of assisting their next production.

Sonje Award 
Sonje Award(선재상) is given to the best Korean and Asian short films in the Wide Angle section, to assist them in producing next project by providing KRW 10,000,000(approx. USD 8,500) to each director.

Actor & Actress of the Year 
Winners will be awarded 5,000,000 KRW (approx. US$5,000) each.

KB New Currents Audience Award 
KNN Award (Audience Award) was awarded by the KNN Foundation to a film from the New Currents section selected by audiences with a $20,000 award for the director. It was renamed as KB New Currents Audience Award(KB 뉴 커런츠 관객상).

Flash Forward Audience Award 
Flash Forward Audience Award(플래시 포워드 관객상)

FIPRESCI Award 
FIPRESCI(International Federation of Film Critics) Award(국제영화비평가연맹상)

NETPAC Award 
The NETPAC Award(아시아영화진흥기구상) is given to the best film selected by the NETPAC(The Network for the Promotion of Asian Cinema) jury among the films screened in the New Currents section.

DGK Megabox Award 
DGK Megabox Award(한국영화감독조합 메가박스상) Boycotted by the Director's Guild of Korea in 2016 and 2017, the award was reinstated in 2018.

Newly created in 2016, this award is given to two promising directors of newly produced independent films in the Korean Cinema Today-Vision section, who have shown the most outstanding production skills. The winner gets a cash prize reward of US$5,000 sponsored by MEGABOX.

CGV Award 
CGV Award(CGV상)

KBS Independent Film Award

CGK Award 
The CGK Award(CGK촬영상), sponsored by Cinematographers Guild of Korea, is given to one Korean film from either New Currents or Korean Cinema Today - Vision section. The winner’s cinematographer will be granted KRW 5,000,000 (approx. USD 4,300).

Critic b Award 
Critic b Award(크리틱b상) is given to one film chosen by Busan Film Critics Association among the selections in New Currents and Korean Cinema Today_Vision.

Watcha Award 

Watcha Award(왓챠상) is established in 2021, the 26th edition of festival, to support new directors in Korean cinema.

Watcha Short Award

Aurora Media Award

Citizen Critics' Award 
Citizen Critics' Award(시민평론가상). The winner is awarded KRW 10,000,000 (approx. USD 8,500) for supporting the director’s next production. This cash prize is sponsored by Philip Morris Korea Inc.

Busan Cinephile Award 
Busan Cinephile Award(부산시네필상). This cash prize is sponsored by YouTube.

See also 
 List of film festivals in South Korea
 Cinema of Korea
 Busan International Comedy Festival
 Busan International Fireworks Festival
 Culture of South Korea

References

External links 

 
 

 
Culture of Busan
Awards established in 1996
Recurring events established in 1996
1996 establishments in South Korea
Annual events in South Korea
Film markets
Film festivals in South Korea
Autumn events in South Korea